Akerselvens Brugseierforening was an industrial association established in 1867 by factories located near Akerselva in Aker and Kristiania, Norway. Its first chairman was Jørgen Meinich, who chaired the association for 25 years. In 1876 the association acquired the rights to exploit all water resources in Nordmarka. From 1885 the association cooperated with the municipality of Kristiania on water supply to the city. The association was dissolved in 1953.

References 

1867 establishments in Norway
Industry in Norway
Hydropower organizations
Water supply and sanitation in Norway
Organisations based in Oslo